Worlds Away is the fourth solo album by John Norum, the guitarist of the Swedish hard rock band Europe. It was released in 1996. This album features the only cover from John's solo releases that does not feature the guitarist himself.

Track listing
 "Manic Distortion" (John Norum, Kelly Keeling, Michelle Meldrum) – 3:18 
 "Make a Move" (J. Norum, K. Keeling, Alan Lorber) – 4:15 
 "C.Y.R." (J. Norum, K. Keeling, Simon Wright) – 4:42 
 "Where the Grass Is Green" (J. Norum, K. Keeling) – 3:46 
 "Center of Balance" (J. Norum, K. Keeling, Peter Baltes, S. Wright) – 6:56 
 "Dogs Are Barking" (J. Norum, K. Keeling, Billy White) – 3:28
 "Homeland (Peace of Mind)" (J. Norum, K. Keeling) – 4:52 
 "Wasted Labor" (J. Norum, K. Keeling) – 5:42 
 "Worlds Away" (J. Norum, K. Keeling) – 4:38 
 "Endica (Revisited)" (J. Norum, P. Baltes, K. Keeling) – 3:58 
 "From Outside In" (P. Baltes, J. Norum, K. Keeling) – 5:09

Personnel
John Norum – vocals, guitars
Kelly Keeling – vocals, keyboards
Peter Baltes – bass guitar
Simon Wright – drums

Album credits 
Jeff Glixman - producer, engineer

John Norum albums
1996 albums
Albums produced by Jeff Glixman